The discography of Jamie T includes five studio albums, two live albums, eight extended plays (EPs), eleven singles and sixteen music videos.

Albums

Studio albums

Live albums
 Panic Prevention Disco: Live @ The Scala (2007)
 Live at Brixton Academy 5 Feb 2010 (2010)

DJ mix albums
 Panic Prevention, Vol. 1 (2005)
 Panic Prevention, Vol. 2 (2005)
 Panic Prevention, Vol. 3 (2006)

EPs
 Betty and the Selfish Sons (2006)
 Exclusive Live Session (2007)
 iTunes Festival: London 2009 (2009)
 MTV.co.uk Live Session (2009)
 Sticks 'n' Stones (2009) – UK No. 15, AUS No. 94
 Chaka Demus (2009) – UK No. 23
 Magnolia Melancholia (2015)
 B Sides (06-17) (2018)

Singles

Promotional singles
 "So Lonely Was the Ballad" / "Back in the Game" (2005)
 "Salvador" / "Livin' with Betty" (2006)
 "Turn to Monsters" ("Kids with Guns" remix) (2006)

Music videos

Other appearances

Compilation appearances
 The Saturday Sessions: The Dermot O'Leary Show (2007) – "A New England"
 Triple J's Like a Version, Vol. 4 (2008) – "Hoover Street"
 Radio 1's Live Lounge, Vol. 4 (2009) – "If I Were a Boy"

Guest appearances
 Babyshambles & Friends – "Janie Jones (Strummerville)" (2006)
 Larrikin Love – The Freedom Spark (2006) (on "Well, Love Does Furnish a Life")
 The BPA – "Same as they Came" (2008)
 The BPA – I Think We're Gonna Need a Bigger Boat (2009) (on "Local Town")
 Tim Armstrong – Tim Timebomb and Friends (2012) (on "Wrongful Suspicion")
 Beatsteaks – Yours (2017) (on "Hate To Love")
 Dylan Cartlidge – Scratch, Sniff - Single (2018) (uncredited on "Up & Upside Down", also co-writer)

Remixes
 Gorillaz – "Kids with Guns" (Jamie T's Turns to Monsters remix) (2006)
 Hot Club de Paris – "Shipwreck" (Stormy Weather mix by Jamie T & Ben Bones) (2007)
 Florence and the Machine – "Rabbit Heart (Raise It Up)" (Jamie T's Lionheart remix) (2009)
 Rum Shebeen – "Tropical" (Jamie T/Ben Bones Bombay mix) (2010)

References

External links
 
 

Discographies of British artists
Hip hop discographies
Rock music discographies